Contest of Champions may refer to:

 Marvel Super Hero Contest of Champions, a 1982 limited series
 Contest of Champions II, a 1999 limited series
 Marvel Contest of Champions, a 2014 video game